"I've Seen It All" is a song recorded by Icelandic singer Björk for the Dancer in the Dark soundtrack, Selmasongs (2000). It was written by the singer, along with Sjón and Lars von Trier (who also directed the film). It was released as the first promotional single from Selmasongs on 21 July 2000, by One Little Indian Records. The song features vocals from Radiohead frontman Thom Yorke. It was nominated for an Academy Award for Best Original Song. Lyrically, it speaks of one coming to terms with the fact that they are going blind.

The version from the soundtrack album Selmasongs is a duet with Radiohead singer Thom Yorke while the version performed in the film Dancer in the Dark is a duet with actor Peter Stormare.

Background

Björk invited Radiohead singer Thom Yorke to record vocals in the album version. This new version was recorded over a four-day span in March 2000, with Björk recording her vocals in Las Vegas. In an interview with Time Out magazine, she said: "It was my idea to work with Thom. We spent four days in Spain just singing as and when we felt like it. He's a very pure soul and I know he doesn't do things lightly. So it was great that he agreed". The song was made available for download through Björk's website on 21 July 2000.

Reception
Alexandra Flood from MTV gave a positive review, saying "The centerpiece of the record is, "I've Seen It All", her duet with Radiohead's Thom Yorke. Björk describes the song as Selma's manifesto. It's a beautiful and eerie track, the pair's vocals careening over a techno beat, but just under a lovely set of strings. It's a minor masterpiece". On the other hand, Ryan Schreiber from Pitchfork said "the paired vocalists also seem an odd match here; when Björk's soaring, intense delivery meets Yorke's general disinterest, the chemistry is far from convincing".

Music videos
There are two music videos for this single. The main version of the video is an excerpt from the film Dancer in the Dark in which Björk, Peter Stormare and others sing the song on a train. The second version was directed by Floria Sigismondi and was an interactive "webeo" (a web animation) for an MTV promotion. Björk appeared with her face painted and the viewer could change the scenes and special effects by clicking on the video. A third version was going to be directed by M/M Paris, but there were several problems with the distribution of the song, and finally the video was cancelled. Later, the idea for this video was used for the "Hidden Place" video.

Live performances
"I've Seen It All" was performed by Björk and the Brodsky Quartet for the very first time in December 1999 at the Union Chapel in London, almost a year before it was released. Björk performed "I've Seen It All" at the 73rd Academy Awards, where the song was nominated for Best Original Song, with a 55-piece orchestra wearing her swan dress. She said before performing on the show, "I'm really excited [to perform]. I won many awards [and] I've been to a lot of [award] shows. This is the most exciting one for me. I'm not just gonna go and grab a fancy frock. It's about singing, so it's a completely different headspace, which is sort of why I'm doing it. I'm really excited. Really, really excited". Billboard ranked it as the ninth "most awesome" Oscar performance of all time, saying that Björk's "outfit may have cemented her place in Oscar lore, but Bjork's performance was just as memorable, and refreshingly unconventional".

Cover versions
"I've Seen It All" has been covered by Bonnie 'Prince' Billy in his 2007 album Ask Forgiveness. It was covered by Tristan Tzara on their 2001 album Omorina Nad Evropom. It was also covered by the jazz organ trio Karl Orgeltríó and singers Ragnar Bjarnason and Salka Sól Eyfeld in 2017.

Credits and personnel
Credits adapted from Björk's official website.

Björk – vocals, songwriting, production, choir arrangement
Sjón – songwriting
Lars von Trier – songwriting
Thom Yorke – vocals
Vince Mendoza – arrangement, orchestration, conduction
Guy Sigsworth – arrangement
Mark Bell – production
Mark "Spike" Stent – mixing

References

2000 singles
Björk songs
Thom Yorke songs
Songs written by Björk
2000 songs
Songs with lyrics by Sjón
Music videos directed by Floria Sigismondi
Song recordings produced by Björk
Male–female vocal duets
Lars von Trier